Petra Kvitová was the defending champion, but could not participate as Victoria Azarenka participated.

World No. 1 Azarenka went on to win the title, defeating Julia Görges in the final 6–3, 6–4.

Seeds

Main draw

Finals

Top half

Bottom half

Qualifying

Seeds

Qualifiers

Lucky losers

Draw

First qualifier

Second qualifier

Third qualifier

Fourth qualifier

References
Main Draw
Qualifying Draw

Generali Ladies Linz - Singles